Oliver L. "Lafe" Parks (June 10, 1899 - February 28, 1985) was a pioneer in the fields of pilot training and aviation studies in the early decades of aviation.

Career
Parks' career started as a Chevrolet salesman at the Gravois Motor corporation in St. Louis. He learned to fly in 1926. Combining his sales and piloting skills, Parks flew a Standard J with the Gravois Motor logo painted on the fuselage and wings.

A friend of Charles Lindbergh, Parks founded the Parks Air College at Lambert Field, St Louis, in 1927 and quickly established higher standards for the amount and quality of training that student pilots were required to complete to earn their commercial pilot's certification. 

In the late 1930s, with war brewing again in Europe, Parks convinced the United States Army Air Corps that the training program at his college could adequately prepare military pilots for combat missions. In October 1938, General Hap Arnold asked the top three aviation school representatives - Oliver Parks, C. C. Moseley of the Curtiss-Wright Technical Institute, and Theopholis Lee of the Boeing School of Aeronautics - to establish an unfunded startup of Civilian Pilot Training Program schools at their own risk; all three agreed. In 1939, Parks was brought to Alabama to set up a Civilian Pilot Training Program for the University of Alabama at Van de Graaff Field. In 1940, he leased all of Curtiss-Steinberg Airport (now St. Louis Downtown Airport), which was renamed Curtiss-Parks Airport, for his school. By the end of World War II, more than 37,000 cadets (more than 10% of the Air Corps and "fully one-sixth of all U.S. Army pilots of the era") had received their primary flight instruction at a Parks school.

In 1944, Parks conducted a nationwide survey to see what features the potential pool of 70,000 new post-war pilots would want in a personal aircraft. When the wartime training program was phased out that year, he went to work for the Engineering and Research Corporation (ERCO). He came up with the novel idea to sell the ERCO Ercoupe monoplane in department stores, signing up Marshall Field & Company in June 1945, followed by Macy's, Bamberger's and other stores in the Midwest. He himself became the Midwest distributor for eight states. Initial sales were encouraging, but the postwar light-aircraft boom did not last, and the Ercoupe was not a commercial success.

In 1946, having concluded that future aviation leaders would need a broader, more academic education and also out of gratitude for the aid given him by Jesuit priests after a 1927 crash, Parks gave the college named after him to Saint Louis University, a Jesuit institution located across the Mississippi River from Parks' Cahokia, Illinois, campus, where it was renamed the Parks College of Engineering, Aviation and Technology of Saint Louis University.

After the war, Parks bought the airport outright and renamed it Parks Metropolitan Airport. He also started two companies, Parks Aircraft Sales and Service for small private airplanes, and Parks Airline, the latter in 1950. Ozark Air Lines later bought Parks' feeder airline. 

In 1959, with the airport experiencing financial difficulties and seeing more potential in real estate, Parks closed the facility and began developing a residential community on the property. However, only about 200 of the 2500 homes in the "St Louis Gardens" subdivision were built. The need for a secondary airport to take pressure off the overcrowded Lambert Field resulted in the property being purchased by the Bi-State Development Agency in 1965 and converted back into an airport. Parks stayed on as airport manager for two years at annual salary of $1.

References

External links
 Parks College of Engineering, Aviation, and Technology
 Saint Louis University
 September 16, 1949 photograph of Parks, in the Saint Louis University Digital Collections

American aviators
American aviation businesspeople
1890s births
1985 deaths